Lowlife is a 2012 Canadian psychological horror film directed by Seth A. Smith. It was first shown at the 2012 Fantasia International Film Festival, then the Atlantic Film Festival where it won the audience award for best feature. In November 2012, the filmmakers organized a DIY Canada-wide theatrical release in 25 cities reaching every province and territory, screening in independent theaters and alternative venues.

Cast
 Chik White as Asa
 Kate Hartigan as Elle
 Mitchell Wiebe as Damon
 John Urich as Dog
 KC Spidle as Boss
 Paul Hammond as Tommy Gods
 William Simmons as The Transient

Filming
The film was shot in the coastal forests surrounding Halifax, Nova Scotia. Shooting took place in the  spring of 2011. Lowlife was Seth Smith's first feature film.

Reception
Vice's Noisey named it "the feel bad hit of 2012" after the release of the trailer. In a review, Film Bizarro said, "It's a really well-crafted movie that manages to be equally terrifying, disgusting, confusing, humorous and highly inspirational to watch." Writer Stephen Cooke compared watching it to "being visually dragged through the mud." Best Horror movies said "It’s a weird, experimental feature that could very well draw a cult following" or "could conceivably disappear just as easily".

Release
The film was released on home video and VOD in August 2014 on BRINKvision.

References

External links

2012 horror films
2012 films
Canadian psychological horror films
English-language Canadian films
Films directed by Seth A. Smith
2010s English-language films
2010s Canadian films